Qebleh Masjed (also known as Kibleh Masjid and Qible Mājid) is a village in Sahandabad Rural District, Tekmeh Dash District, Bostanabad County, East Azerbaijan Province, Iran. At the 2006 census, its population was 92, in 21 families.

References 

Populated places in Bostanabad County